James Grenville (12 February 1715 – 14 September 1783) was a British politician.

He was born at Wotton House, Buckinghamshire in 1715 into the influential Grenville political family and was one of five brothers who went into politics. He was the third son of Richard Grenville, a prominent Buckinghamshire politician and his brothers included Richard Grenville-Temple, 2nd Earl Temple, George Grenville, later the Prime Minister, and Thomas Grenville. He was educated at Eton College (1728-32) and studied law at the Inner Temple, where he was called to the bar in 1738.

In 1738 he inherited Butleigh Court, Somerset from his aunt Catherine Riggs née Symcox.

He was first elected as a Member of Parliament in 1741 on the slate of Lord Cobham and served as one of Cobham's Cubs during his early years in parliament. In 1746 he was given a position at the Board of Trade. From 1756 to 1761, under Pitt, he was a junior Lord of the Treasury. Other positions included Lord of the Treasury (Nov. 1756-Apr. 1757 and July 1757-Mar. 1761), Cofferer of the Household (Mar.-Oct. 1761), Privy Counsellor, 1761 and Joint Vice-Treasurer of Ireland (Aug. 1766-Jan. 1770).

In October 1761 following his brother-in-law William Pitt's resignation, James Grenville resigned along with him and went into opposition. He later oversaw the reconciliation between George Grenville, who had caused a rift with his family by not resigning, and their eldest brother Richard Grenville-Temple, 2nd Earl Temple a close ally of Pitt.

He married Mary, the daughter and heiress of James Smyth of South Elkington, Lincolnshire and with her had twin sons. He was succeeded in 1783 by his son James, who received most of his estate and was later created Baron Glastonbury, although some property also passed to the younger twin General Richard Grenville. Both sons served together as the MPs for Buckingham from 1774 to 1780.

He is buried Church of St Leonard, Butleigh.

References

Bibliography
 Lawson, Philip. George Grenville: A Political Life. University of Manchester Press, 1984.

1715 births
1783 deaths
People from Buckinghamshire
People educated at Eton College
Members of the Inner Temple
Members of the Parliament of Great Britain for English constituencies
Younger sons of earls
British MPs 1741–1747
British MPs 1747–1754
British MPs 1754–1761
British MPs 1761–1768
British MPs 1768–1774
Members of the Privy Council of Great Britain
James Grenville